Zourafa or Ladoxera is a uninhabited Greek islet rock in the Aegean Sea, east of Samothrace, and north of Imbros. It lies at the northeastern tip of the Thracian Sporades, and is administratively part of the regional unit of Evros. Its total area is only 9 sq.m. and the total length of the coastline 12 meters (in previous measurements 165 meters). It belongs to the protected areas of the pan-European program NATURA since 2011.

Name 
There appear to be various hypotheses about the origin of the first name. The earliest reference is to an Ottoman map of 1521 by the Ottoman Turkish explorer Piri Reis, which describes it as Zurafa Kaya (modern Turkish: Zürafa Kayalıkları, Giraffe Rocks) without being depicted, so its current name is alleged by some to be derived from this. On the contrary, the folklorist George Lekakis argues that it is a combination of the word "zoura" with the meaning of level and the word "fa" which has the meaning of light / manifest. Variations of the same name are Sgorafa or Tzourafa.

The name Ladoxera seems to derive from the presence of oily waters and the smell of oil. Its alternate name, Ladoxera "oil reef", was given to it by sailors who would often spot oil slicks around Zourafa.

In a Flemish map of 1585 it is called Halonesus, while in Venetian in the 1690s it appears to be referred to as Holonisus.

Geography 
Zourafa has been gradually reduced in size by erosion. Sailors are cautioned about navigating in the vicinity of Zourafa.

Zourafa is part of Greece, and there is a lighthouse on the island. In 2011, it was reported in Greek press that Turkey had started questioning the issue of treaties over the islet, however it is unclear if this is official Turkish policy (see Aegean dispute).

Lighthouse 
The lighthouse on Zourafa was destroyed by severe weather in the winter of 2012 and was rebuilt by September. The new lighthouse is powered by solar energy. An icon of Saint Nicholas was placed "in prominent view". Saint Nicholas is the patron saint of sailors, and his icon is found on many ships and in many ports in Greece.

Preservation 
Zourafa comprises a Natura 2000-designated area, along with the Fengari mountain and eastern coastal region of Samothrace and the bordering sea. The site was designated a Special Area of Conservation in 2011.

References 

Uninhabited islands of Greece
Samothrace
Landforms of Evros (regional unit)
Islands of Eastern Macedonia and Thrace
Islands of Greece